Below is a list of governors of the Brazilian state of Mato Grosso.

See also
 List of Governors of Mato Grosso do Sul

Mato Grosso